James De Lancey (November 27, 1703 – July 30, 1760) served as chief justice, lieutenant governor, and acting colonial governor of the Province of New York.

Early life and education 
De Lancey was born in New York City on November 27, 1703, the first son of Étienne de Lancy and Anne, a daughter of Stephanus Van Cortlandt. His brother, Oliver De Lancey, became a senior Loyalist officer in the American War of Independence, joining General Howe on Staten Island in 1776, and raising and equipping De Lancey's Brigade, three battalions of 1,500 Loyalist volunteers from New York State. His sister Susannah Delancey became the wife of Admiral Sir Peter Warren, and another sister, Anne DeLancey, became the wife of John Watts, member of the New York General Assembly.

James went to England for his schooling, and to Corpus Christi College, Cambridge, where he was tutored by future Archbishop of Canterbury Thomas Herring, before studying law at the Inner Temple, London.  Having been admitted to the bar in 1725, he returned to New York to practice law and enter politics.

Career 
Also in 1729, De Lancey was made a member of the New York Assembly, and in 1731 was appointed as second justice of the Supreme Court of New York. In 1730, De Lancey was chosen to lead a commission to frame a new charter for the City of New York. Passed into law in 1732 by the New York Assembly, "the Montgomerie Charter," was principally the work of James De Lancey, who, for his services, was presented with the Freedom of the City Medal. Also in 1730, De Lancey was appointed to the Governor's Council.

Cosby v. Van Dam, 1733 
When Royal Governor of New York and New Jersey John Montgomerie died in July 1731, Council President Rip Van Dam was elected acting governor in New York, and Lewis Morris, President of the New Jersey Provincial Council took over the duties temporarily in New Jersey. William Cosby was appointed Captain General & Governor on January 13, 1732 and arrived in New York thirteen months later. Cosby demanded that Van Dam turn over the salary he had received as interim Acting Governor. Confident that Justices Frederick Philipse and De Lancey, who together constituted a majority of the Supreme Court of Judicature, would rule in his favor, he brought suit as a bill in equity in order to avoid a jury trial. Lewis Morris had served as Chief Justice of New York since 1715. Although Cosby won the case, Lewis wrote a minority dissent, which was printed for public distribution. Cosby retaliated by removing Morris from office. (The Lords of the Board of Trade in London later ruled that Morris's removal had been illegal.)

Crown v. John Peter Zenger, 1735 
In 1733, on the removal of chief justice Lewis Morris, De Lancey was appointed in his stead, and served as chief justice of New York for the remainder of his life. 

When two Grand Juries failed to return an indictment for seditious libel against journalist John Peter Zenger, the Attorney General filed an information and Justices Philipse and De Lancey issued a bench warrant. In response to a writ of habeas corpus, De Lancey set bail far beyond Zenger's means and he was committed to await trial. Zenger was represented by James Alexander, a former attorney general of the colony and William Smith, both of whom had written anonymous articles for Zenger's paper critical of the Cosby. They challenged the make up of the court, arguing that Chief Justice Morris' summary removal was illegal, and therefore so too De Lancey's appointment to replace him. The court then struck  their names from the list of attorneys admitted to practice before the Supreme Court of Judicature. 

The court appointed the relatively inexperienced John Chambers, who nonetheless, successfully challenged the list of jurors to ensure a non-biased panel. Meanwhile, supporters of Zenger contacted noted lawyer Andrew Hamilton who volunteered to take the case "pro bono". As Hamilton was from Philadelphia he was outside the reach of influence of the New York judges. De Lancey instructed the jury that they need to only decide if Zenger printed the articles which appeared clearly libelous. Hamilton argued his case directly to the jury which shortly returned a verdict of not guilty. This was an early instance of jury nullification. The Zenger trial is recognized as a landmark colonial case that eventually led to the establishment of a free press in America.

In 1744, one year into George Clinton's position as Governor of New York, De Lancey was granted a commission as New York's chief justice where he became a dominant political force with many relying on his support for their continued time in office and salary. In the same year, he was elected a member of The American Philosophical Society.

Lieutenant governor 
In 1746 a dispute arose between Governor George Clinton and the New York Assembly regarding the governor's salary. Chief Justice De Lancey supported the legislature's position in the controversy, thus incurring the enmity of Governor Clinton, who subsequently refused to acknowledge a commission from King George II (dated October 27, 1747), appointing De Lancey as Lieutenant Governor of New York. Governor Clinton withheld De Lancey's commission as lieutenant governor until October 1753.

With the advent of the French and Indian War, Lt. Gov. De Lancey convened and presided over a congress of colonial delegates held in Albany, New York in June 1754 (Albany Congress), for the purpose of establishing an alliance with the Indians for the common defense against the French.

In October 1754, Lt. Gov. De Lancey granted a charter for the creation of King's College (now Columbia University). In July 1755, Lt. Gov. De Lancey attended a council of governors of the colonies, held at Alexandria, Virginia, to coordinate defense matters with General Braddock against the French.

In September 1755, Sir Charles Hardy arrived from London and assumed the functions of Governor of New York, thus returning Lt. Gov. De Lancey to his role as Chief Justice.  Hardy's tenure as governor came to an end in July 1757, when Sir Charles took command of a military expedition to Louisbourg, Nova Scotia, once again leaving De Lancey the de facto ruler of the province, which he remained till his death.

Family 
In 1729, James De Lancey married Anne Heathcote, daughter of Caleb Heathcote, a former mayor of New York City, at Trinity Church.
Captain James De Lancey (1732–1800), who took over the family dry goods business and was active in New York provincial politics.
Anna De Lancey, who married Thomas Jones (historian).
Susannah De Lancey, who died unmarried but raised Susannah Burritt, the daughter of the Rev. Blackleach Burritt and Martha Welles.
De Lancey died on July 30, 1760 in New York City.

Legacy 
Delancey Street on New York City's Lower East Side was named in honor of James De Lancey.

References 
Notes

Sources
 D.A. Story, The DeLancey's: Romance of a Great Family, Toronto, Nelson & Sons, 1931
 Milton M. Klein, ‘DeLancey, James (1703–1760)’, Oxford Dictionary of National Biography, Oxford University Press, 2004, accessed 26 Aug 2008
Raymond, Marcius D. Sketch of Rev. Blackleach Burritt and related Stratford families : a paper read before the Fairfield County Historical Society, at Bridgeport, Conn., Friday evening, Feb. 19, 1892. Bridgeport : Fairfield County Historical Society 1892.
 
 Colonial Governors of NY
 James De Lancey

1703 births
1760 deaths
Governors of the Province of New York
Members of the New York Provincial Assembly
Alumni of Corpus Christi College, Cambridge
American people of Dutch descent
Members of the Inner Temple
Schuyler family
Politicians from New York City
People of the Province of New York
Members of the American Philosophical Society
De Lancey family
Members of the New York Executive Council